Drymus or Drymos was a town in ancient Acarnania.

The site of Drymus is at Palioklissi (Palioklissia, Paliokklesi),  from the Ambracian coast. Remains of early Byzantine basilicas have been discovered, along with pottery, metalwork, and sculpture. Documentary evidence mention a 5th-century bishop.

References

Populated places in ancient Acarnania
Former populated places in Greece
Archaeological sites in Greece
Byzantine sites in Greece